Limnonectes quangninhensis (Quangninh Wart Frog; Vietnamese: Ếch nhẽo Quảng Ninh) is a species of fanged frog in the family Dicroglossidae. Its type locality is Quảng Sơn Commune, Hải Hà District, Quảng Ninh Province, Vietnam, where it was found in an evergreen forest near Tai Chi Village (21°31.785’N, 107°38.965’E, 195 meters above sea level). It is found in islands of the Gulf of Tonkin, and is also likely found across the border in Fangchenggang, Guangxi, China. It is a sister taxon to Limnonectes fujianensis.

References

Pham, C. T., M. D. Le, T. T. Nguyen, T. Ziegler, Z. J. Wu, and T. Q. Nguyen. 2017. A new species of Limnonectes (Amphibia: Anura: Dicroglossidae) from Vietnam. Zootaxa 4269: 545–558.
A New Species of Limnonectes (Anura: Dicroglossidae) from northeastern Vietnam

Amphibians of Vietnam
quangninhensis
Amphibians described in 2017